John Lloyd Williams may refer to:

 John Lloyd Williams (botanist and musician) (1854–1945), Welsh botanist, author, and musician
 John Lloyd Williams (politician) (1892–1982), British Member of Parliament
 John Lloyd Williams (RAF officer) (1894–?), British flying ace

See also 
 John Williams (disambiguation)
 John L. Williams (disambiguation)